La Vergne is a city in Rutherford County, Tennessee, United States. The population was 38,719 at the 2020 census. La Vergne lies within the Nashville Metropolitan Statistical Area.

History
La Vergne was incorporated in 1861. Historical variant names include Laveren and Lavergne.

Geography
La Vergne is located in northern Rutherford County southeast of Nashville. It directly borders the Antioch neighborhood of Nashville on the northwest, Smyrna on the southeast, and Percy Priest Lake on the northeast. Interstate 24 and U.S. routes 41 and 70S pass through the community. The Percy Priest Reservoir on the Stones River lies to the north of the community.

Demographics

2020 census

As of the 2020 United States census, there were 38,719 people, 10,929 households, and 8,673 families residing in the city.

2018
As of the special census of 2018, there were 34,423 people (from 18,687 in 2000 census), 11,204 households (from 6,536 households in 2000), and 8,901 families residing in the city. The population density was 753.7 people per square mile (290.9/km2). There were 6,994 housing units at an average density of 282.1 per square mile (108.9/km2). The racial makeup of the city was 84.50% White, 11.02% African American, 0.43% Native American, 1.32% Asian, 0.07% Pacific Islander, 1.28% from other races, and 1.39% from two or more races. Hispanic or Latino of any race were 3.54% of the population.

There were 6,536 households, out of which 46.4% had children under the age of 18 living with them, 61.9% were married couples living together, 12.4% had a female householder with no husband present, and 20.6% were non-families. 15.3% of all households were made up of individuals, and 2.9% had someone living alone who was 65 years of age or older. The average household size was 2.86 and the average family size was 3.17.

In the city, the population was spread out, with 31.4% under the age of 18, 7.6% from 18 to 24, 38.9% from 25 to 44, 17.7% from 45 to 64, and 4.5% who were 65 years of age or older. The median age was 31 years. For every 100 females, there were 97.3 males. For every 100 females age 18 and over, there were 94.7 males.

The median income for a household in the city was $51,478, and the median income for a family was $55,226. Males had a median income of $35,743 versus $26,323 for females. The per capita income for the city was $19,580. About 4.1% of families and 4.8% of the population were below the poverty line, including 6.7% of those under age 18 and 5.7% of those age 65 or over.

The largest subdivision of homes in the state of Tennessee, Lake Forest Estates, is located in La Vergne, encompassing more than 3,100 homes.

Economy
The top employers in the city are:
 Ingram Book Company: 1,500
 Bridgestone/Firestone Inc.: 900
 Venture Express: 800
 Quality Industries: 500
 Saks Fifth Avenue Distribution Center: 454
 Cardinal Health: 300
 Ajax Turner Co Inc: 250
 ICEE: 200
La Vergne hosts one of two United States printing plants for the multinational publishing company Lightning Source and serves as the company's headquarters.

In November 2015, Hong Kong based Sinomax announced they would be investing $28 million into making the defunct Whirlpool plant into their North American manufacturing headquarters, creating 350 jobs. This investment is the largest by a Chinese company in Tennessee's history.

Schools
 La Vergne Primary School
 Roy Waldron School
 La Vergne Lake Elementary School
 Rock Springs Elementary School
 La Vergne Middle School
 La Vergne High School

References

External links

Cities in Tennessee
Cities in Rutherford County, Tennessee
Cities in Nashville metropolitan area
Populated places established in 1852
1852 establishments in Tennessee
Majority-minority cities and towns in Tennessee